Takaida Station is the name of two train stations in Osaka Prefecture, Japan:

 Takaida Station (Higashiōsaka)
 Takaida Station (Kashiwara)